BIOCEV z.s.p.o. (abbreviation for Biotechnology and Biomedicine Center in Vestec) is an association of legal entities which consists of six institutes of the Czech Academy of Sciences, the Faculty of Science and the First Faculty of Medicine of Charles University in Prague. The institute was opened in 2015.

The institute is located 5 km outside of Prague and was funded by the Operational Programme Research and Development for Innovations and the European Regional Development Fund.

References

Science and technology in the Czech Republic
Czech Academy of Sciences
Charles University
2014 establishments in the Czech Republic